The Three Friends of Winter is an art motif that comprises the pine, bamboo, and plum. The Chinese celebrated the pine, bamboo and plum together, as they observed that these plants do not wither as the cold days deepen into the winter season unlike many other plants. Known by the Chinese as the Three Friends of Winter, they later entered the conventions of East Asian culture and Vietnamese culture. Together they symbolize steadfastness, perseverance, and resilience. They are highly regarded in Confucianism and as such represent the scholar-gentleman's ideal.

History
The Three Friends of Winter are common in works of art from Chinese culture and those cultures influenced by it. The three are first recorded as appearing together in a ninth-century poem by the poet Zhu Qingyu of the Tang dynasty. The Southern Song dynasty artist Zhao Mengjian (c. 1199–1264), among others of the time, made this grouping popular in painting.

The actual term "Three Friends of Winter" can be traced back to the earliest known mention in literature, the Record of the Five-cloud Plum Cottage from The Clear Mountain Collection by the Song dynasty writer Lin Jingxi (1242–1310):

In other places 
The Three Friends of Winter as Sho Chiku Bai in Japanese (literally "pine, bamboo, plum")

In Japan, they are particularly associated with the start of the New Year, appearing on greeting cards and as a design stamped into seasonal sweets. Shōchikubai is sometimes also used as a three-tier ranking system. In this context, the pine (matsu) usually is the highest rank, followed by bamboo (take) as the middle rank, and plum (ume) as the lowest.

In a Korean poem by Kim Yuki (1580–1658), the three friends are brought together in order to underline the paradoxical contrast:

In Vietnam, the three along with chrysanthemum create a combination of four trees and flowers usually seen in pictures and decorative items. The four also appear in works but mostly separately with the same symbolic significance. They are known as Tuế hàn tam hữu in Vietnamese.

See also
 Chinese culture
 Four Gentlemen of the Year
 Four Treasures of the Study
 Trees in Chinese mythology
 Mirror Flower, Water Moon

References

Chinese culture
Chinese painting
Japanese painting
Chinese iconography
Japanese iconography
East Asian art
Plants in art
East Asian traditions